The Tooele Valley Railroad Complex, 35 N. Broadway in Tooele, Utah, dates from 1909.  It was listed on the National Register of Historic Places in 1984.

The complex is currently operated as the Tooele Valley Museum and Historic Park (formerly Tooele Valley Railroad Museum and prior to that as the Tooele County Museum). Opened in 1983, the museum is operated by the city and features preserved locomotives, equipment and artifacts from the Tooele Valley Railway, International Smelting and Refining Company, and other railroad & mining artifacts.

The complex is significant for its historic role in conversion of Tooele from a farming-based to an industrial town.  The railroad depot was the headquarters of the Tooele Valley Railway; and is the most significant surviving artifact with association to the smelter east of Tooele that operated from 1910 to 1972.

The listing included three contributing buildings and four contributing objects.

References

External links
 Tooele Valley Railroad Museum - Tooele City Parks & Recreation

Rail infrastructure on the National Register of Historic Places in Utah
National Register of Historic Places in Tooele County, Utah
1909 establishments in Utah
Buildings and structures in Tooele County, Utah
Museums in Tooele County, Utah
Railroad museums in Utah
Mining museums in Utah